Markus Thorbjörnsson (born 1 October 1987) is a former Swedish footballer who played as either a central or wide defender, finishing his career at Dalkurd FF.
He spent the majority of his top flight career at Kalmar FF.

Career

Dalkurd FF
In February 2019, he joined Dalkurd FF in Allsvenskan permanently, after having playing for the club on loan in the 2018 season. On 10 December 2019 it was confirmed, that Thorbjörnsson was one out of four players that would leave the club.

References

External links

1987 births
Living people
Association football defenders
Falkenbergs FF players
Kalmar FF players
Jönköpings Södra IF players
Dalkurd FF players
Allsvenskan players
Superettan players
Swedish footballers